Alfonso Marotta (2 August 1923 – 16 May 1982) was an Italian modern pentathlete. He competed at the 1952 Summer Olympics.

References

External links
 

1923 births
1982 deaths
Italian male modern pentathletes
Olympic modern pentathletes of Italy
Modern pentathletes at the 1952 Summer Olympics
People from Avellino
Sportspeople from the Province of Avellino
20th-century Italian people